In photography and cinematography, a filter is a camera accessory consisting of an optical filter that can be inserted into the optical path. The filter can be of a square or oblong shape and mounted in a holder accessory, or, more commonly, a glass or plastic disk in a metal or plastic ring frame, which can be screwed into the front of or clipped onto the camera lens.

Filters modify the images recorded. Sometimes they are used to make only subtle changes to images; other times the image would simply not be possible without them. In monochrome photography, coloured filters affect the relative brightness of different colours; red lipstick may be rendered as anything from almost white to almost black with different filters. Others change the colour balance of images, so that photographs under incandescent lighting show colours as they are perceived, rather than with a reddish tinge. There are filters that distort the image in a desired way, diffusing an otherwise sharp image, adding a starry effect, etc. Linear and circular polarising filters reduce oblique reflections from non-metallic surfaces.

Many filters absorb part of the light available, necessitating longer exposure. As the filter is in the optical path, any imperfections – non-flat or non-parallel surfaces, reflections (minimised by optical coating), scratches, dirt – affect the image.

There is no universal or reliably standard naming or labelling system for filters. The Wratten numbers adopted in the early twentieth century by Kodak, then a dominant force in film photography, are used by several manufacturers, but the degree of correspondence between the filters and the number labels is only approximate. Most colour correction filters are somewhat more accurately identified by a code of the form CCb, e.g. CC50Y – CC for colour correction,  = 50 for the strength of the filter (50%), and b = Y for yellow.

Optical filters are used in various areas of science, including in particular astronomy; photographic filters are roughly the same as "optical" filters, but in practice optical filters often need far more accurately controlled optical properties and precisely defined transmission curves than filters only made for general photography. Photographic filters sell in larger quantities, at correspondingly lower prices, than many laboratory filters. The article on optical filters has information relevant to photographic filters, particularly special-purpose photographic filters like color enhancing filters and high-quality photographic filters, like sharp cut-off UV filters.

In digital photography the majority of filters used with film cameras have been rendered redundant by digital filters applied either in-camera or during post processing. Exceptions include the ultraviolet (UV) filter typically used to protect the front surface of the lens, the neutral density (ND) filter, the polarising filter, color-enhancing filters, and the infra red (IR) filter. The neutral density filter permits effects requiring wide apertures or long exposures to be applied to brightly lit scenes, while the graduated neutral density filter is useful in situations where the scene's dynamic range exceeds the capability of the sensor. Not using optical filters in front of the lens has the advantage of avoiding the reduction of image quality caused by the presence of an extra optical element in the light path and may be necessary to avoid vignetting when using wide-angle lenses.

Uses
Filters in photography can be classified according to their use:
 Clear and ultraviolet
 Color correction
 Color conversion (or light balance)
 Color separation, also called color subtraction
 Contrast enhancement
 Infrared
 Neutral density, including the graduated neutral density filter and solar filter
 Polarizing
 Special effects of various kinds, including
 Graduated color, called color grads
 Cross screen and star diffractors
 Diffusion and contrast reduction
 Spot
 Close-up or macro diopters, and split diopters or split focus

Clear and ultraviolet

Clear filters, also known as window glass filters or optical flats, are transparent and (ideally) perform no filtering of incoming light. The only use of a clear filter is to protect the front of a lens.

Clear glass will absorb some UV.

UV filters are used to block invisible ultraviolet light, to which most photographic sensors and film are at least slightly sensitive. The UV is typically recorded as if it were blue light, so this non-human UV sensitivity can result in an unwanted exaggeration of the bluish tint of atmospheric haze or, even more unnaturally, of subjects in open shade lit by the ultraviolet-rich sky.

Normally, the glass or plastic of a camera lens is practically opaque to short-wavelength UV, but transparent to long-wavelength (near-visible) UV. A UV filter passes all or nearly all of the visible spectrum but blocks virtually all ultraviolet radiation. (Most spectral manipulation filters are named for the radiation they pass; green and infrared filters pass their named colors, but a UV filter blocks UV.) It can be left on the lens for nearly all shots: UV filters are often used mainly for lens protection in the same way as clear filters. A strong UV filter, such as a Haze-2A or UV17, cuts off some visible light in the violet part of the spectrum, and has a pale yellow color; these strong filters are more effective at cutting haze, reduce purple fringing in digital cameras, and can subtly darken pale blue skies – which improves contrast between sky and clouds. Strong UV filters are also sometimes used for warming color photos taken in shade with daylight-type film. They were originally developed to increase contrast in airborne surveillance photography, and were adopted by mountaineering photographers to remedy the strong UV at high altitude.

While in certain cases, such as harsh environments, a protection filter may be necessary, there are also downsides to this practice. Arguments for the use of protection filters include:
 If the lens is dropped, the filter may well suffer scratches or breakage instead of the front lens element.
 The filter can be cleaned frequently without damage to the lens surface or coatings; a filter scratched by cleaning is much less expensive to replace than a lens.
 If there is blowing sand the filter will protect the front of the lens from abrasion and nicks.
 A few lenses, such as some of Canon's L series lenses, require the use of a filter to complete their weather sealing.

Arguments against their use include:
 Adding another element may degrade image quality if its surfaces are less than perfectly flat and parallel. Filters from reputable makers are very unlikely to cause any problems, but some "bargain" products are optically inferior.
 The two additional reflections at air-glass interfaces inevitably result in some light loss – at least four percent at each interface, if the surfaces are uncoated; they also increase the potential for lens flare problems.
 Low-quality filters may cause problems with autofocus.
 A filter may be incompatible with the use of a lens hood, since not all filters have the required threading for a screw-in hood or will allow a clip-on hood to be attached. Adding a lens hood on top of one or more filters may space the hood away from the lens enough to cause some vignetting.

There is a wide variation in the spectral UV blocking by filters described as ultraviolet.

Color conversion
Appropriate color conversion filters are used to compensate for the effects of lighting not balanced for the film stock's rated color temperature (usually 3200 K for professional tungstens and 5500 K for daylight): e.g., the 80A blue filter used with film for daylight use corrects the perceived orange/reddish cast of incandescent photographic photoflood lighting (for which the usual photographic term is "tungsten lighting"), and significantly improves the stronger cast produced by lower-temperature household incandescent lighting, while the 85B will correct the bluish cast of daylight photographs on tungsten film. Color correction filters are identified by non-standardised numbers which vary from manufacturer to manufacturer. The need for these filters has been greatly reduced by the widespread adoption of digital photography, since color balance may be corrected with camera settings as the image is captured, or by software manipulation afterwards.

Color conversion filters (LB filters) must be distinguished from color correction filters (CC filters), which filter out a particular color cast f.e. caused by Schwarzschild effect etc.

Color subtraction
Color subtraction filters work by absorbing certain colors of light, letting the remaining colors through. They can be used to demonstrate the primary colors that make up an image. They are perhaps most frequently used in the printing industry for color separations, and again, use has diminished as digital solutions have become more advanced and abundant.

Didymium filters, sold as "color enhancement" or "fall color" filters act similarly: They remove a narrow (or broad) band of color in the yellow part of the spectrum (589 nm). Some astronomical filters similarly use didymium in heavier concentration. Even astronomical filters which don't use didymium typically are some kind of narrow pass-band color filter.

Contrast enhancement 

Colored filters are commonly used in black and white photography to alter the effect of different colors in the scene, changing contrast recorded in black and white of the different colours.

For example, a yellow filter or, more dramatically, an orange or red filter, will enhance the contrast between clouds and sky by darkening the blue sky while leaving the clouds bright (after exposure compensation). A deep green filter will also darken the sky, and additionally lighten green foliage, making it stand out against the sky. Light yellowish-green filters were used as standard portrait filters for panchromatic film, since they render skin-tones as light to dark grey, while darkening deep reds and blues to nearly black.

A sky-blue filter (cyan) mimics the effect of older orthochromatic film – or with a "true blue" filter, even older film only sensitive to blue light – rendering blue as light and red and green as dark, showing blue skies the same as overcast, with no contrast between sky and clouds, darkening blond hair, making blue eyes nearly white, and red lips nearly black.

Diffusion filters have the opposite, contrast-reducing effect; in addition they "soften" focus, making small blemishes invisible.

Polarizer

A polarizing filter, used for both color and black-and-white photography, is colourless and does not affect colour balance, but filters out light with a particular direction of polarisation. This reduces oblique reflections from non-metallic surfaces, can darken the sky in colour photography (in monochrome photography colour filters are more effective), and can saturate the image more by eliminating unwanted reflections.

Linear polarising filters, while effective, can interfere with metering and auto-focus mechanisms when mirrors or beam-splitters are in the light path, as in the digital single lens reflex camera; a circular polarizer is also effective, and does not affect metering or auto-focus.

Neutral density
A neutral density filter (ND filter) is a filter of uniform density which attenuates light of all colors equally. It is used to allow a longer exposure (to create blur) or larger aperture (for selective focus) than otherwise required for correct exposure in the prevailing light conditions, without changing the tonal balance of the photograph.

A graduated neutral density filter is a neutral density filter with different attenuation at different points, typically clear in one half shading into a higher density in the other. It can be used, for example, to photograph a scene with part in deep shadow and part brightly lit, where otherwise either the shadows would have no detail or the highlights would be burnt out.

Cross 
A cross screen filter, also known as a star filter, creates a star pattern, in which lines radiate outward from bright objects.  The star pattern is generated by a very fine diffraction grating embedded in the filter, or sometimes by the use of prisms in the filter. The number of stars varies by the construction of the filter, as does the number of points each star has.

Diffusion

A diffusion filter (also called a softening filter) softens subjects and generates a dreamy haze (see photon diffusion). This is most often used for portraits. It also has the effect of reducing contrast, and the filters are designed, labeled, sold, and  used for that purpose too. There are many ways of accomplishing this effect, and thus filters from different manufacturers vary significantly. The two primary approaches are to use some form of grid or netting in the filter, or to use something which is transparent but not optically sharp.

Both effects can be achieved in software, which can in principle provide a very precise degree of control of the level of effect, however the "look" may be noticeably different. If there is too much contrast in a scene, the dynamic range of the digital image sensor or film may be exceeded, which post-processing cannot compensate for, so contrast reduction at the time of image capture may be called for.

Close-up and split diopter lenses

A close-up lens is not technically a filter but accessory lens which attaches to a lens like a filter, hence the alternative but misleading term "close-up filter". They are often sold by filter manufacturers as part of their product lines, using the same holders and attachment systems. A close-up lens is a single or two-element converging lens used for close-up and macro photography, and works in the same way as spectacles used for reading. The insertion of a converging lens in front of the taking lens reduces the focal length of the combination.

Close-up lenses are usually specified by their optical power, the reciprocal of the focal length in meters. Several close-up lenses may be used in combination; the optical power of the combination is the sum of the optical powers of the component lenses; a set of lenses of +1, +2, and +4 diopters can be combined to provide a range from +1 to +7 in steps of one.

A split diopter has just a semicircular half of a close-up lens in a normal filter holder. It can be used to photograph a close object and a much more distant background, with everything in sharp focus; with any non-split lens the depth of field would be far too shallow.

Materials and construction
Photo filters are commonly made from glass, resin plastics similar to those used for eyeglasses (such as CR-39), polyester and polycarbonate; sometimes acetate is used. Historically, filters were often made from gelatin, and color gels. While some filters are still described as gelatin or gel filters, they are no longer actually made from gelatin but from one of the plastics mentioned above.

Sometimes the filter is dyed in the mass, in other cases the filter is a thin sheet of material sandwiched between two pieces of clear glass or plastic.

Certain kinds of filters use other materials inside a glass sandwich; for example, polarizers often use various special films, netting filters have nylon netting, and so forth.

The rings on screw-on filters are often made of aluminum, though in more expensive filters brass is used. Aluminum filter rings are much lighter in weight, but can "bind" to the aluminum lens threads they are screwed in to, requiring the use of a filter wrench to get the filter off of the lens. Aluminum also dents or deforms more easily.

High quality filters are multi-coated, with multiple-layer optical coatings to reduce reflections. Uncoated filters can reflect up to 12% of the light, single-coated filter can reduce this considerably, and multi-coated filters can allow up to 99.8% of the light to pass through (0.2% unwanted reflection); the loss of light is not important, but part of the light is reflected inside the camera, producing flare and reducing the contrast of the image.

Filter sizes and mountings
Manufacturers of lenses and filters have standardized on several different sets of sizes over the years.

Threaded round filters
The most common standard filter sizes for circular filters include 30.5 mm, 35.5 mm, 37 mm, 39 mm, 40.5 mm, 43 mm, 46 mm, 49 mm, 52 mm, 55 mm, 58 mm, 62 mm, 67 mm, 72 mm, 77 mm, 82 mm, 86 mm, 95 mm, 105 mm, 112 mm 122 mm, 127 mm. The filter diameter has a steady increase from 43 to 58 mm every 3 mm and from 62 to 82 mm every 5 mm. Other filter sizes within this range may be hard to find since the filter size may be non-standard or may be rarely used on camera lenses. The specified diameter of the filter in millimeters indicates the diameter of the male threads on the filter housing. The thread pitch is 0.5 mm, 0.75 mm or 1.0 mm, depending on the ring size.  A few sizes (e.g. 30.5 mm) come in more than one pitch.

The filter diameter for a particular lens is commonly identified on the lens face by the ⌀ symbol. For example, a lens marking may indicate: “⌀55 mm” or “55⌀” meaning it would accept a 55 mm filter or lens hood.

 Table notes: Most often refers to 0.75 mm pitch thread, but an (incompatible) 1.0 mm pitch thread is sometimes used instead by some manufacturers.

Square filters
For square filters, 2" × 2", 3" × 3" and 4" × 4" were historically very common and are still made by some manufacturers. 100 mm × 100 mm is very close to 4" × 4", allowing use of many of the same holders, and is one of the more popular sizes currently (2006) in use; it is virtually a standard in the motion picture industry. 75 mm x 75 mm is very close to 3" × 3" and while less common today, was much in vogue in the 1990s.

The French manufacturer Cokin makes a wide range of filters and holders in three sizes which is collectively known as the Cokin System. "A" (amateur) size is 67 mm wide, “P” (professional) size is 84 mm wide, and “X Pro” is 130 mm wide. Many other manufacturers make filters to fit Cokin holders. Cokin also makes a filter holder for 100 mm filters, which they call the “Z” size. Most of Cokin's filters are made of optical resins such as CR-39. A few round filter elements may be attached to the square/rectangular filter holders, usually polarizers and gradient filters which both need to be rotated and are more expensive to manufacture.

Cokin formerly (1980s through mid-1990s) had competition from Hoya's 'Hoyarex' system (75 mm x 75 mm filters mostly made from resin) and also a range made by Ambico, but both have withdrawn from the market. A small (84 mm) “system” range is still made (as of 2012) by Formatt Hitech. In general, square (and sometimes rectangular) filters from one system could be used in another system's holders if the size was correct, but each made a different system of filter holder which could not be used together. Lee, Tiffen, Formatt Hitech and Singh Ray also make square / rectangular filters in the 100 × 100 and Cokin “P” sizes.

Gel filters are very common in square form, rarely being used in circular form. These are thin flexible sheets of gelatin or plastic which must be held in rigid frames to prevent them from sagging. Gels are made not only for use as photo filters, but also in a wide range of colors for use in lighting applications, particularly for theatrical lighting. Gel holders are available from all of the square “system” makers, but are additionally provided by many camera manufacturers, by manufacturers of gel filters, and by makers of expensive professional camera accessories (particularly those manufacturers which target the movie and television camera markets.

Square filter systems often have lens shades available to attach to the filter holders.

Rectangular filters
Graduated filters of a given width (67 mm, 84 mm, 100 mm, etc.) are often made oblong, rather than square, in order to allow the position of the gradation to be moved up or down in the picture. This allows, for example, the red part of a sunset filter to be placed at the horizon. These are used with the "system" holders described above.

Bayonet round filters
Certain manufacturers, most notably Rollei and Hasselblad, have created their own systems of bayonet mount for filters. Each design comes in several sizes, such as Bay I through Bay VIII for Rollei, and Bay 50 through Bay 104 for Hasselblad.

Series filters
Starting in the 1930s, filters were also made in a sizing system known as a series mount. The filters themselves were round pieces of glass (or occasionally other materials) with no threads. Very early filters had no rims around the glass, but the more common later production filters had the glass mounted in metal rims. To mount the filters on a camera, the filter was placed between two rings; the mount ring either screwed into the lens threads or was slipped over the lens barrel and the retaining ring screws into the mounting ring to hold the filter in place. The series designations are generally written as Roman numerals, I to IX, though there are a few sizes not written that way, such as Series 4.5 and Series 5.5. Most Series filter sizes are now obsolete, production having ceased by the late 1970s. However, Series 9 became a standard of the motion picture industry and Series 9 filters are still produced and sold today, particularly for professional motion picture cinematography.

See also
 Color gel
 List of photographic equipment makers
 Optical filter

Footnotes

References

External links

 Photography Filters
 UV filters test - Description of the results and summary - Lenstip.com
 Polarizing filters test - Results and summary - Lenstip.com
 Analysis of Camera Filters | Camera Filters.biz

Optical filters
Filter